Symerton is a village in Will County, Illinois, United States. The population was 128 at the 2020 census. By population, it is the smallest village in Will County.

Geography
Symerton is located at  (41.328133, -88.054550).

It is the smallest village in Will County by size and by population. It is located between Peotone and Wilmington.

History
Symerton was served by the Wabash Railroad. The Will County Historical Society moved the depot to Lockport, Illinois, to serve as part of the society's frontier village; however, the frontier village was evicted from its site in 2009, and the depot was placed into storage.
During the early 1940s, the government bought land in Jackson and Florence townships in order to build the Joliet Arsenal. As a result, farmers were forced to leave Jackson and Florence Townships, and many moved their homes down the street, to Symerton.

Demographics

As of the census of 2000, there were 106 people, 34 households, and 24 families residing in the village. The racial makeup of the village was 99.06% White and 0.94% African American.

There were 34 households, out of which 38.2% had children under the age of 18 living with them, 64.7% were married couples living together, 2.9% had a female householder with no husband present, and 26.5% were non-families. 23.5% of all households were made up of individuals, and 5.9% had someone living alone who was 65 years of age or older. The average household size was 3.12 and the average family size was 3.76.

In the village, the population was spread out, with 30.2% under the age of 18, 11.3% from 18 to 24, 28.3% from 25 to 44, 24.5% from 45 to 64, and 5.7% who were 65 years of age or older. The median age was 30 years. For every 100 females, there were 100.0 males. For every 100 females age 18 and over, there were 94.7 males.

As of 2019, the median income for a household in the village was $72,917. 1.0% of households were below the poverty line .

References

External links
Epodunk: Symerton, Illinois

Villages in Will County, Illinois
Villages in Illinois